108 Mile Ranch is a residential community of 700 homes situated in the South Cariboo region of British Columbia located in a historic area of ranches and lakes.

Historically, en route to the great Cariboo Gold Rush, a few of the travellers settled here.

A feature of the 108 community is its green belt lands. Comprising more than  these community parklands include 108 and Sepa Lakes, Walker Valley and many small patches scattered around the ranch.

South Cariboo Regional Airport is the regional facility for the South Cariboo. Located on Highway 97, The 108 Heritage Site is a tourist attraction with its growing number of restored buildings, including the largest log barn in Canada.

Transportation

Airports
It is the regional aerodrome for the South Cariboo Regional District, with capabilities of handling commercial passenger service, MEDEVAC, flight training, and corporate traffic.

References

External links
108 Mile Ranch Community Association
108 Mile Ranch Heritage Site
 Buckaroos in BC: the Story of Ranching in British Columbia Virtual exhibit on the history of ranching in British Columbia.

Unincorporated settlements in British Columbia
Geography of the Cariboo
Populated places in the Cariboo Regional District
Ranches in British Columbia